1171 Rusthawelia, provisional designation , is a large and dark background asteroid, approximately  in diameter, located in the outer regions of the asteroid belt. It was discovered on 3 October 1930, by Belgian astronomer Sylvain Arend at the Royal Observatory of Belgium in Uccle, and was an unnoticed rediscovery of a lost minor planet then known as "Adelaide". As the asteroid was already named for Georgian poet Shota Rustaveli when the rediscovery was realized, its former designation was given to another asteroid instead, which is now known as 525 Adelaide. Rusthawelia is a primitive P-type asteroid and has a rotation period of 11 hours.

Unnoticed rediscovery of lost asteroid 

When Arend discovered Rusthawelia in 1930, it was not realized that he rediscovered the long-lost asteroid "525 Adelaide". Only decades later, in 1958, it was shown by French astronomer André Patry that both asteroid's discovered by Wolf and Arend were one and the same. It was then decided that this asteroid retains the number–name designation "1171 Rusthawelia", while 525 Adelaide was vacated and given to another asteroid (which was the object , discovered by Joel Hastings Metcalf).

Another confusion occurred in 1929, one year before Arend's discovery, when American astronomer Anne Sewell Young thought to have found long-lost "Adelide", when in fact she mistook the asteroid for comet 31P/Schwassmann–Wachmann that had a very similar orbital eccentricity.

Orbit and classification 

Rusthawelia is a non-family asteroid from the main belt's background population. It orbits the Sun in the outer main-belt at a distance of 2.6–3.8 AU once every 5 years and 8 months (2,079 days; semi-major axis of 3.19 AU). Its orbit has an eccentricity of 0.19 and an inclination of 3° with respect to the ecliptic.

Naming 

This minor planet was named for medieval Georgian poet Shota Rustaveli (შოთა რუსთაველი, c. 1160 – after c. 1220). The official naming citation was mentioned in The Names of the Minor Planets by Paul Herget in 1955.

Physical characteristics 

Rusthawelia is a dark and primitive P-type asteroid, as characterized by the Wide-field Infrared Survey Explorer (WISE), and classified by Tholen.

Rotation period 

In October and November 2003, two rotational lightcurves of Rusthawelia were obtained from photometric observations by John Menke at his observatory in Barnesville, Maryland, and by a group of American astronomers. Lightcurve analysis gave a well-defined rotation period of 10.80 and 10.98 hours and a brightness variation of 0.31 and 0.26 magnitude, respectively. A third, concurring period of 11.013 hours with an amplitude of 0.26 magnitude was obtained by French amateur astronomer René Roy in February 2005.

Diameter and albedo 

According to the surveys carried out by the Infrared Astronomical Satellite IRAS, the Japanese Akari satellite and the NEOWISE mission of NASA's WISE telescope, Rusthawelia measures between 68.67 and 82.23 kilometers in diameter and its surface has an albedo between 0.029 and 0.04. The Collaborative Asteroid Lightcurve Link adopts the results obtained by IRAS, that is, an albedo of 0.0394 and a diameter of 70.13 kilometers based on an absolute magnitude of 9.90.

References

External links 
 Asteroid Lightcurve Database (LCDB), query form (info )
 Dictionary of Minor Planet Names, Google books
 Asteroids and comets rotation curves, CdR – Observatoire de Genève, Raoul Behrend
 Discovery Circumstances: Numbered Minor Planets (1)-(5000) – Minor Planet Center
 
 

001171
Discoveries by Sylvain Arend
Named minor planets
001171
19301003